A nipple shield is a nipple-shaped sheath worn over the areola and nipple during breastfeeding. Modern nipple shields are made of soft, thin, flexible silicone and have holes at the end of the nipple section to allow the breast milk to pass through.

Usage 

Nipple shields are used in various situations:
 Some mothers have small or inverted nipples which make it difficult for the baby to latch on. Using a shield allows for feeding to progress until the baby's suction draws out the nipple.
 Small, weak or sick babies often have difficulty latching on to the breast. A nipple shield makes latching easier and prevents the baby becoming discouraged.
 Babies who had to be bottle-fed since birth can become used to the bottle teat. Nipple shields feel more like teats, and aid with the transition to breast feeding.
 A mother's nipples can become sore or cracked from breastfeeding. A shield allows the mother to continue breastfeeding until her cracked nipples heal and she improves her latching technique.
 They make it easier to measure the quantity of milk consumed.

Most doctors and lactation consultants stress that nipple shields use should be temporary; the aim is always to return to regular breastfeeding, unless otherwise indicated.

Breast shells may be confused with nipple shields, but shields are intended for use during the act of breastfeeding, whereas breast shells are worn in preparation for breastfeeding.

History

Older nipple shields were made of latex and harder, thicker plastics, and often caused more problems than they solved. Before the invention of plastics, nipple shields were made of metal, glass, or ivory. A 17th-century nipple shield held in Shakespeare's birthplace is made of pewter.

See also
 Pasties, a nipple cover used (often for legal reasons) when the breast is otherwise exposed
 Breast petal, a nipple cover used under clothing for a smoother line

Further reading

 

Breastfeeding
Shield (breastfeeding)